Mendoncia is a genus of climbing plants in the family Acanthaceae.

It is native to southeastern South America, Africa, and Madagascar. In South America, some of its species are endemic to Brazil in the Atlantic Forest and/or Cerrado ecoregions; in Africa the largest number of species is found in Cameroon and Gabon.

Species
Species include:
Mendoncia coccinea 
Mendoncia combretoides 
Mendoncia floribunda
Mendoncia lindaviana 
Mendocia lindavii 
Mendoncia mollis
Mendoncia puberula
Mendoncia velloziana

References

 
Acanthaceae genera
Flora of Brazil
Flora of the Atlantic Forest
Flora of the Cerrado
Taxa named by Carl Friedrich Philipp von Martius